Pedro Nicolás Sansotre (born 8 September 1993) is an Argentine professional footballer who plays as a right-back for San Martín de Tucumán.

Career
Almagro gave Sansotre his beginning in professional football. He featured in twenty-three Primera B Metropolitana matches in 2013–14, which included his debut on 18 September 2013 away from home versus UAI Urquiza. He received his first senior red card in the same fixture in the succeeding 2014 campaign. 2015 ended with promotion to Primera B Nacional, where they remained for three seasons. Sansotre made a total of one hundred and thirty-nine appearances for them. On 30 June 2018, Sansotre joined fellow tier two team Villa Dálmine. His first senior goal soon came, as he netted in a November draw with Guillermo Brown.

On 29 August 2020, Sansotre joined Tigre He left Tigre again in February 2021, after signing with San Martín de Tucumán.

Career statistics
.

References

External links

1993 births
Living people
Sportspeople from Buenos Aires Province
Argentine footballers
Association football defenders
Primera B Metropolitana players
Primera Nacional players
Club Almagro players
Villa Dálmine footballers
Club Atlético Tigre footballers
San Martín de Tucumán footballers